Mark Fairles Morton (28 September 1865 – 28 September 1938) was an Australian politician.

He was born near Nowra to surveyor Henry Gordon Morton and Jane, née Fairlies. He attended Numbaa Public School and Hurstville College in Goulburn before working on the bridge over the Shoalhaven River at Nowra. He subsequently worked as a stock agent before settling in Nowra as an auctioneer. He served on Nowra Council from 1896, with a period as mayor in 1901. From 1906 to 1916 he was a member of the Aborigines Protection Board. 

On 6 March 1907, he married Minnie Fuller, with whom he had a son; on 23 April 1919 he married Sarah Emily Fuller. From a political family, his brothers Philip and Henry and his nephew Pat also served in the New South Wales Parliament, while his brother-in-law George Fuller was Premier.

In 1901, he was elected to the New South Wales Legislative Assembly as the Liberal member for Shoalhaven. Shoalhaven was renamed Allowrie in 1904. By the time proportional representation was introduced in 1920, Morton was a Nationalist, but he failed to win a seat until 1922, when he was elected as one of the members for Wollondilly. Defeated in 1925, he returned in 1928 and served until his death at Nowra in 1938.

The Morton National Park is named after him.

References

 

1865 births
1938 deaths
Nationalist Party of Australia members of the Parliament of New South Wales
United Australia Party members of the Parliament of New South Wales
Members of the New South Wales Legislative Assembly
Mayors of places in New South Wales
New South Wales local councillors
Australian auctioneers